Thrall is a city in Williamson County, Texas, United States. Its population was 816 at the 2020 census. The name Thrall was chosen by the community to honor the Rev. Homer S. Thrall, a Methodist minister and historian much admired by local settlers and residents. Thrall was founded in 1876.

Geography

Thrall is located at  (30.588640, –97.298707), about 35 miles northeast of Austin.

According to the United States Census Bureau, the city has a total area of 0.4 square miles (1.1 km2), all of it land. It is located in Williamson County.

Demographics

As of the 2020 United States census, 816 people, 205 households, and 144 families were residing in the city.

As of the census of 2000, 710 people, 255 households, and 189 families resided in the city. The population density was 1,746.8 people per square mile (668.6/km2). The 264 housing units had an average density of 649.5/sq mi (248.6/km2). The racial makeup of the city was 70.00% White, 8.59% African American, 1.41% Native American, 0.14% Pacific Islander, 18.03% from other races, and 1.83% from two or more races. Hispanics or Latinos of any race were 35.92% of the population.

Of the 255 households, 37.6% had children under 18 living with them, 56.1% were married couples living together, 11.4% had a female householder with no husband present, and 25.5% were not families. About 23.5% of all households were made up of individuals, and 15.7% had someone living alone who was 65 or older. The average household size was 2.78, and the average family size was 3.28.

In the city, the age distribution was 30.1% under 18, 6.6% from 18 to 24, 27.6% from 25 to 44, 19.4% from 45 to 64, and 16.2% who were 65 or older. The median age was 34 years. For every 100 females, there were 91.4 males. For every 100 females 18 and over, there were 88.6 males.

The median income for a household in the city was $34,205, and for a family was $36,845. Males had a median income of $28,897 versus $17,813 for females. The per capita income for the city was $13,807. About 12.4% of families and 19.2% of the population were below the poverty line, including 20.7% of those under age 18 and 21.5% of those age 65 or over.

Education
The city of Thrall is served by the Thrall Independent School District, home to the Thrall High School Tigers.

Thrall flood
From September 7 to 10, 1921, the remnants of a hurricane moved over Williamson County.  The center of the storm became stationary over Thrall, dropping a storm total of 39.7 inches of rain in 36 hours.

Eighty-seven people drowned in and near Taylor, and 93 in Williamson County.  Thrall rainfall was 23.4 inches during 6 hours, 31.8 in. during 12 hours, and 36.4 in. during 18 hours.  This storm caused the most deadly floods in Texas, with a total of 215 fatalities.

References

External links
 

Cities in Williamson County, Texas
Cities in Texas
Greater Austin